The Anhut Motor Car Company was an American brass era automobile manufacturer, based in Detroit, Michigan, from 1909 until 1910.

History 
The company was founded by Michigan State Senator John Anhut and Detroit mayor Philip Breitmeyer, who became vice-president of the company. It was capitalized at US$150,000.

Organized in October 1909, the factory was located at 510 Howard Street in Detroit.

The car was known as the Anhut 6, and used a Brownell six-cylinder overhead valve engine of 3.7L displacement, producing , with a  wheelbase. Three body styles were offered: a two-seat roadster at US$1700, and a four-seat toy tonneau and a four-seat rumble seat roadster, each at US$1800.

Sales were promising, and the company purchased the factory of the bankrupt Chatham Motor Car Company in 1910, continuing to manufacture badge engineered Chathams under its own brand for the Canadian market.

Anhut relinquished control of the company in order to concentrate on his upcoming re-election to the Michigan State Senate. The company was taken over by factory superintendent HC Barnes, who re-organised the company into the Barnes Motor Car Company in September 1910.

Barnes planned to build a six-cylinder car for $2,250 and a four-cylinder for $1,400, but the company was bankrupt by November 1910. In January 1911, the physical remains of the company was sold to the Autoparts Company of Detroit, who specialised in buying up the assets of automobile companies that had gone out of business.

See also
Brass Era car

References

External links
1910 Anhut tourer

Defunct motor vehicle manufacturers of the United States
Motor vehicle manufacturers based in Michigan
Manufacturing companies based in Detroit
Defunct manufacturing companies based in Michigan